In enzymology, a deacetylvindoline O-acetyltransferase is an enzyme that catalyzes the chemical reaction

acetyl-CoA + deacetylvindoline  CoA + vindoline

Thus, the two substrates of this enzyme are acetyl-CoA and deacetylvindoline, whereas its two products are CoA and vindoline.

This enzyme belongs to the family of transferases, specifically those acyltransferases transferring groups other than aminoacyl groups.  The systematic name of this enzyme class is acetyl-CoA:deacetylvindoline 4-O-acetyltransferase. Other names in common use include deacetylvindoline acetyltransferase, DAT, 17-O-deacetylvindoline-17-O-acetyltransferase, acetylcoenzyme A-deacetylvindoline 4-O-acetyltransferase, acetyl-CoA-17-O-deacetylvindoline 17-O-acetyltransferase, acetylcoenzyme A:deacetylvindoline 4-O-acetyltransferase, acetylcoenzyme A:deacetylvindoline O-acetyltransferase, 17-O-deacetylvindoline O-acetyltransferase, and acetyl-CoA:17-O-deacetylvindoline 17-O-acetyltransferase.  This enzyme participates in terpene indole and ipecac alkaloid biosynthesis.

References

 

EC 2.3.1
Enzymes of unknown structure